National Retail Solutions (also known as NRS or NRSplus) is a point-of-sale company. The company is the provider of touch-screen point-of-sale (POS) systems that offers a customer-facing screen as well as payment and transaction processing services. NRS is a division of IDT Corporation and the company's headquarters are in Newark, New Jersey. The  company  also  provides an NRS Pay credit card processing for various independent stores.

NRS was founded in 2015 by Elie Y. Katz, who is currently the president and CEO. It is headquartered in Newark, New Jersey.

NRS is a subsidiary of IDT Corporation.

Divisions

NRS' divisions include point-of-sale (POS), NRS Digital Media, NRS Pay credit card processing, NRS Insights, NRS Funding (cash advance), NRS Petro (gas station/convenience store) and NRS EBT (assisting stores with the processing of SNAP payments).

References 

Financial services companies of the United States
American companies established in 2015
Financial services companies established in 2015
Technology companies established in 2015
Technology companies of the United States
Companies based in Newark, New Jersey
2015 disestablishments in New Jersey